Homaloxestis myeloxesta is a moth in the family Lecithoceridae. It is found in Taiwan and Japan.

References

Moths described in 1932
myeloxesta
Moths of Japan